The 1994 Honduran Cup was the fifth edition, C.D. Marathón won its first and only title after beating Real Maya in the final match.

First round

Group A

Standings

Group B

Standings

Final round

Semifinals

Final

Honduran Cup seasons
Cup